Spider-Woman is the name of several characters in Marvel Comics:
 Spider-Woman (Jessica Drew), the original and current Spider-Woman
Spider-Woman (comic book), a comic book starring Jessica Drew
 Julia Carpenter, a former Avengers member, now called Arachne and a member of Omega Flight
 Spider-Woman (Mattie Franklin), who briefly impersonated Spider-Man before receiving her own short-lived comic series was active during the 2007 miniseries Loners
 Spider-Woman (Charlotte Witter), the only villain to use the name
 Spider-Gwen, the Gwen Stacy of Earth-65 who goes by the name Spider-Woman.

It may also refer to:
 Jorōgumo, a Japanese mythological spirit (obake) spider-spirit that transforms into a woman
 Spider-Woman (TV series), an animated TV series based on the Marvel Comics character Jessica Drew
 The Spider Woman, a 1944 Sherlock Holmes film
 Teotihuacan Spider Woman, a Teotihuacan goddess
 Spider Woman, the Space Ghost villain, known on Space Ghost Coast to Coast as Black Widow 
 The Spider Woman of some Native American Indian storytellers who is also known as Spider Old Woman and Spider Grandmother.
 Spiderwoman Theater, an Indigenous women's performance troupe
 SpiderWoman the web browser on NeXTSTEP
 "Spider Woman" (song), by Uriah Heep, 1972

See also 
 Kiss of the Spider Woman (disambiguation)
 Spider Grandmother